This list gives an overview of the classification of non-silicate minerals and includes mostly International Mineralogical Association (IMA) recognized minerals and its groupings. This list complements the List of minerals recognized by the International Mineralogical Association series of articles and List of minerals. Rocks, ores, mineral mixtures, not IMA approved minerals, not named minerals are mostly excluded. Mostly major groups only, or groupings used by New Dana Classification and Mindat.

Classification of minerals

Introduction 
The grouping of the New Dana Classification and of the mindat.org is similar only, and so this classification is an overview only. Consistency is missing too on the group name endings (group, subgroup, series) between New Dana Classification and mindat.org. Category, class and supergroup name endings are used as layout tools in the list as well.
 
Abbreviations
 "*" – Mineral not IMA-approved.
 "?" – IMA discredited mineral name.
 "REE" – Rare-earth element (Sc, Y, La, Ce, Pr, Nd, Pm, Sm, Eu, Gd, Tb, Dy, Ho, Er, Tm, Yb, Lu)
 "PGE" – Platinum-group element (Ru, Rh, Pd, Os, Ir, Pt)

Category 01 
 
 Elements: Metals and Alloys, Carbides, Silicides, Nitrides, Phosphides
 :Category:Diamond
 :Category:Gold

Class: Native elements 
 :Category:Carbide minerals
 Osbornite group carbides and nitrides
 Osbornite TiN, Khamrabaevite (Ti,V,Fe)C, Niobocarbide (Nb,Ta)C, Tantalcarbide TaC
 :Category:Phosphide minerals
 Barringerite group phosphides
 Barringerite (Fe,Ni)2P, Schreibersite (Fe,Ni)3P, Nickelphosphide (Ni,Fe)3P, Allabogdanite (Fe,Ni)2P, Melliniite (Ni,Fe)4P, Monipite MoNiP
 Copper group/ Gold group
 Gold Au, Silver Ag, Copper Cu, Lead Pb, Aluminium Al, Maldonite Au2Bi
 Silver Amalgam Alloys
 Amalgam* Ag2Hg3, Moschellandsbergite Ag2Hg3, Schachnerite Ag1.1Hg0.9, Paraschachnerite Ag3Hg2, Luanheite Ag3Hg, Eugenite Ag9Hg2, Weishanite (Au,Ag)3Hg2
 Iron-Nickel group
 Iron Fe, Kamacite? alpha-(Fe,Ni), Taenite gamma-(Fe,Ni), Tetrataenite FeNi, Awaruite Ni2Fe to Ni3Fe, Nickel Ni, Wairauite CoFe
 Suessite group silicides
 Suessite (Fe,Ni)3Si, Gupeiite Fe3Si, Xifengite Fe5Si3, Hapkeite Fe2Si, Luobusaite Fe0.83Si2, Mavlyanovite Mn5Si3, Brownleeite MnSi
 Platinum group (Space group Fm3m)
 Platinum Pt, Iridium (Ir,Os,Ru,Pt), Rhodium (Rh,Pt), Palladium Pd,Pt
 Osmium group (Space group P63/mmc)
 Osmium (Os,Ir), Ruthenium (Ru,Ir,Os), Rutheniridosmine (Ir,Os,Ru), Hexaferrum (Fe,Os,Ru,Ir), Hexamolybdenum (Mo,Ru,Fe,Ir,Os), IMA2008-055 (Ni,Fe,Ir)
 Tetraferroplatinum group (Space group P4/mmm)
 Tetraferroplatinum PtFe, Tulameenite Pt2FeCu, Ferronickelplatinum Pt2FeNi, Potarite PdHg
 Isoferroplatinum group (Space group Pm3m)
 Isoferroplatinum (Pt,Pd)3(Fe,Cu), Rustenburgite (Pt,Pd)3Sn, Atokite (Pd,Pt)3Sn, Zvyagintsevite Pd3Pb, Chengdeite Ir3Fe, Yixunite Pt3In
 Arsenic group
 Arsenic As, Antimony Sb, Stibarsen SbAs, Bismuth Bi, Stistaite SnSb
 Carbon polymorph group (IMA-CNMNC discourages a grouping of diamond and graphite, Mills et al. (2009))
 Graphite C, Chaoite C, Fullerite C60, (Diamond C, Lonsdaleite C)

Category 02 
   
 Sulfides, Sulfosalts, Sulfarsenates, Sulfantimonates, Selenides, Tellurides

Class: Sulfide minerals - including Selenides and Tellurides 
 Chalcocite-Digenite group ([Cu]2−x S] formulae)
 Chalcocite Cu2S, Djurleite Cu31S16, Digenite Cu9S5, Roxbyite Cu1.78S, Anilite Cu7S4, Geerite Cu8S5, Spionkopite Cu1.4S
 Joseite group (Trigonal: R-3m)
 Joseite Bi4(S,Te)3, Joseite-B Bi4(S,Te)3, Ikunolite Bi4(S,Se)3, Laitakarite Bi4(Se,S)3, Pilsenite Bi4Te3, Poubaite PbBi2Se2(Te,S)2, Rucklidgeite (Bi,Pb)3Te4, Babkinite Pb2Bi2(S,Se)3
 Pentlandite group (Isometric: Fm3m)
 Pentlandite (Fe,Ni)9S8, Argentopentlandite Ag(Fe,Ni)8S8, Cobaltpentlandite Co9S8, Shadlunite (Pb,Cd)(Fe,Cu)8S8, Manganoshadlunite (Mn,Pb)(Cu,Fe)8S8, Geffroyite (Ag,Cu,Fe)9(Se,S)8
 Galena group (Isometric: Fm3m, IMA-CNMNC discourages the use of this grouping, Mills et al. (2009))
 Galena PbS, Clausthalite PbSe, Altaite PbTe, Alabandite MnS, Oldhamite (Calcium sulfide) (Ca,Mg,Fe)S, Niningerite (Mg,Fe2+,Mn)S, Borovskite Pd3SbTe4, Crerarite (Pt,Pb)Bi3(S,Se)4−x (x~0.7), Keilite (Fe,Mn,Mg,Ca,Cr)S
 Sphalerite group (Isometric: F4-3m)
 Sphalerite (Zn,Fe)S, Stilleite ZnSe, Metacinnabar HgS, Tiemannite HgSe, Coloradoite HgTe, Hawleyite CdS, Rudashevskyite (Fe,Zn)S
 Wurtzite group (Hexagonal: P63mc)
 Wurtzite (Zn,Fe)S, Greenockite CdS, Cadmoselite CdSe, Rambergite MnS
 Nickeline group (Hexagonal: P63/mmc)
 Nickeline NiAs, Breithauptite NiSb, Sederholmite NiSe, Hexatestibiopanickelite (Ni,Pd)(Te,Sb), Sudburyite (Pd,Ni)Sb, Kotulskite Pd(Te,Bi), Sobolevskite PdBi, Stumpflite Pt(Sb,Bi), Langisite (Co,Ni)As, Freboldite CoSe, Achavalite FeSe, Sorosite Cu(Sn,Sb), Vavrinite Ni2SbTe2
 Chalcopyrite group (Tetragonal: I-42d)
 Chalcopyrite CuFeS2, Eskebornite CuFeSe2, Gallite CuGaS2, Roquesite CuInS2, Lenaite AgFeS2, Laforetite AgInS2
 Stannite group (Tetragonal: I-42m) A2BCS type
 Stannite Cu2FeSnS4, Cernyite Cu2CdSnS4, Briartite Cu2(Zn,Fe)GeS4, Kuramite Cu3SnS4, Sakuraiite (Cu,Zn,Fe,In,Sn)4S4, Hocartite Ag2FeSnS4, Pirquitasite Ag2ZnSnS4, Velikite Cu2HgSnS4, Kesterite Cu2(Zn,Fe)SnS4, Ferrokesterite Cu2(Fe,Zn)SnS4, Barquillite Cu2CdGeS4
 Thiospinel group, AB2X4 (Isometric: Fd3m)
 Bornhardtite Co2+(Co3+)2Se4, Cadmoindite CdIn2S4, Carrollite Cu(Co,Ni)2S4, Cuproiridsite CuIr2S4, Cuprorhodsite CuRh2S4, Daubréelite Fe2+Cr2S4, Ferrorhodsite (Fe,Cu)(Rh,Ir,Pt)2S4, Fletcherite (mineral) Cu(Ni,Co)2S4, Florensovite Cu(Cr1.5Sb0.5)S4, Greigite Fe2+(Fe3+)2S4, Indite Fe2+In2S4, Kalininite ZnCr2S4, Linnaeite Co2+(Co3+)2S4, Malanite Cu(Pt,Ir)2S4, Polydymite NiNi2S4, Siegenite (Ni,Co)3S4, Violarite Fe2+(Ni3+)2S4, Trustedtite Ni3Se4, Tyrrellite (Cu,Co,Ni)3Se4
 Tetradymite group (Trigonal: R-3m)
 Tetradymite Bi2Te2S, Tellurobismuthite Bi2Te3, Tellurantimony Sb2Te3, Paraguanajuatite Bi2(Se,S)3, Kawazulite Bi2(Te,Se,S)3, Skippenite Bi2Se2(Te,S), Vihorlatite Bi24Se17Te4
 Pyrite group (Isometric: Pa3)
 Pyrite FeS2, Vaesite NiS2, Cattierite CoS2, Penroseite (Ni,Co,Cu)Se2, Trogtalite CoSe2, Villamaninite (Cu,Ni,Co,Fe)S2, Fukuchilite Cu3FeS8, Krutaite CuSe2, Hauerite MnS2, Laurite RuS2, Aurostibite AuSb2, Krutovite NiAs2, Sperrylite PtAs2, Geversite Pt(Sb,Bi)2, Insizwaite Pt(Bi,Sb)2, Erlichmanite OsS2, Dzharkenite FeSe2, Gaotaiite Ir3Te8, Mayingite IrBiTe
 Marcasite group (Orthorhombic: Pnnm)
 Marcasite FeS2, Ferroselite FeSe2, Frohbergite FeTe2, Hastite? CoSe2, Mattagamite CoTe2, Kullerudite NiSe2, Omeiite (Os,Ru)As2, Anduoite (Ru,Os)As2, Lollingite FeAs2, Seinajokite (Fe,Ni)(Sb,As)2, Safflorite (Co,Fe)As2, Rammelsbergite NiAs2, Nisbite NiSb2
 Cobaltite group (Cubic or pseudocubic crystals)
 Cobaltite CoAsS, Gersdorffite NiAsS, Ullmannite NiSbS, Willyamite (Co,Ni)SbS, Tolovkite IrSbS, Platarsite (Pt,Rh,Ru)AsS, Irarsite (Ir,Ru,Rh,Pt)AsS, Hollingworthite (Rh,Pt,Pd)AsS, Jolliffeite (Ni,Co)AsSe, Padmaite PdBiSe, Michenerite (Pd,Pt)BiTe, Maslovite PtBiTe, Testibiopalladite PdTe(Sb,Te), Changchengite IrBiS, Milotaite PdSbSe, Kalungaite PdAsSe
 Arsenopyrite group (Monoclinic: P21/c (Pseudo-orthorhombic))
 Arsenopyrite FeAsS, Gudmundite FeSbS, Osarsite (Os,Ru)AsS, Ruarsite RuAsS, Iridarsenite (Ir,Ru)As2, Clinosafflorite (Co,Fe,Ni)As2
Molybdenite group
Drysdallite Mo(Se,S)2, Molybdenite MoS2, Tungstenite WS2
Skutterudite group
Ferroskutterudite (Fe,Co)As3; Nickelskutterudite NiAs2-3; Skutterudite (Co,Fe,Ni)As2-3; Kieftite CoSb3

Class: Sulfosalt minerals 
 

 Colusite group
 Colusite Cu12-13V(As,Sb,Sn,Ge)3S16, Germanocolusite Cu13V(Ge,As)3S16, Nekrasovite Cu+26V2(Sn,As,Sb)6S32, Stibiocolusite Cu13V(Sb,As,Sn)3S16
 Cylindrite group
 Cylindrite Pb3Sn4FeSb2S14, Franckeite (Pb,Sn)6Fe2+Sn2Sb2S14, Incaite Pb4Sn4FeSb2S15, Potosiite Pb6Sn2FeSb2S14, Abramovite Pb2SnInBiS7, Coiraite (Pb,Sn)12.5As3Sn5FeS28
Hauchecornite group (Tetragonal: P4/nnn or I4/mmm)
Hauchecornite Ni9Bi(Sb,Bi)S8, Bismutohauchecornite Ni9Bi2S8, Tellurohauchecornite Ni9BiTeS8, Arsenohauchecornite Ni18Bi3AsS16, Tucekite Ni9Sb2S8
 Tetrahedrite group (Isometric: I-43m)
 Tetrahedrite (Cu,Fe)12Sb4S13, Tennantite (Cu,Fe)12As4S13, Freibergite (Ag,Cu,Fe)12(Sb,As)4S13, Hakite (Cu,Hg)3(Sb,As)(Se,S)3, Giraudite (Cu,Zn,Ag)12(As,Sb)4(Se,S)13, Goldfieldite Cu12(Te,Sb,As)4S13, Argentotennantite (Ag,Cu)10(Zn,Fe)2(As,Sb)4S13
Proustite group
Proustite Ag3AsS3, Pyrargyrite Ag3SbS3
 Aikinite group (Orthorhombic containing Pb, Cu, Bi, and S)
 Aikinite PbCuBiS3, Krupkaite PbCuBi3S6, Gladite PbCuBi5S9, Hammarite Pb2Cu2Bi4S9 (?), Friedrichite Pb5Cu5Bi7S18, Pekoite PbCuBi11(S,Se)18, Lindstromite Pb3Cu3Bi7S15, Salzburgite Cu1.6Pb1.6Bi6.4S12
 Lillianite group (Orthorhombic, AmBnS6 where A=Pb, Ag, Mn and B=Sb, Bi)
 Lillianite Pb3Bi2S6, Bursaite? Pb5Bi4S11, Gustavite PbAgBi3S6 (?), Andorite PbAgSb3S6, Uchucchacuaite AgPb3MnSb5S12, Ramdohrite Ag3Pb6Sb11S24, Roshchinite Ag19Pb10Sb51S96 or Pb(Ag,Cu)2(Sb,As)5S10, Fizelyite Pb14Ag5Sb21S48
Matildite group
Matildite AgBiS2, Bohdanowiczite AgBiSe2, Volynskite AgBiTe2, Zlatogorite CuNiSb2
Sartorite group
Sartorite PbAs2S4, Guettardite Pb(Sb,As)2S4, Twinnite Pb(Sb,As)2S4, Marumoite Pb32As40S92
 Pavonite group (Monoclinic: C/2c bismuth sulfosalts)
 Pavonite (Ag,Cu)(Bi,Pb)3S5, Makovickyite Ag1.5Bi5.5S9, Benjaminite (Ag,Cu)3(Bi,Pb)7S12, Mummeite Cu0.58Ag3.11Pb1.10Bi6.65S13, Borodaevite Ag5(Bi,Sb)9S16, Cupropavonite AgPbCu2Bi5S10, Cupromakovickyite Cu4AgPb2Bi9S18, Kudriavite (Cd,Pb)Bi2S4, IMA2008-058 Ag5Bi13S22, IMA2005-036 Cu8Pb4Ag3Bi19S38

Category 03 
 

 Halogenides, Oxyhalides, Hydroxyhalides
 Atacamite group
 Polymorths of Cu2[(OH)3|Cl]: Atacamite, Botallackite, Clinoatacamite, Paratacamite
 Gillardite Cu3Ni(OH)6Cl2, Haydeeite Cu3Mg(OH)6Cl2, Herbertsmithite Cu3Zn[(OH)3|Cl]2, Kapellasite Cu3Zn[(OH)3|Cl]2
 Fluorite group
 Fluorite CaF2, Fluorocronite PbF2, Frankdicksonite BaF2, Tveitite-(Y) Ca1−xYxF2+x (x~0.3), IMA2009-014 SrF2
 Halite group (IMA-CNMNC discourages the use of this grouping, Mills et al. (2009))
 Halite NaCl, Sylvite KCl, Villiaumite NaF, Carobbiite KF, Griceite LiF
 Chlorargyrite group
 Bromargyrite AgBr, Chlorargyrite AgCl, Marshite CuI, Miersite (Ag,Cu)I, Nantokite CuCl 
 Lawrencite group
 Chloromagnesite MgCl2, Lawrencite (Fe2+,Ni)Cl2, Scacchite MnCl2, Tolbachite CuCl2
 Matlockite group
 Bismoclite (BiO)Cl, Daubréeite (BiO)(OH,Cl), Laurionite PbCl(OH), Paralaurionite PbCl(OH), Rorisite CaFCl, Zavaritskite (BiO)F, Matlockite PbFCl
 Challacolloite group
 Challacolloite KPb2Cl5, Hephaistosite TlPb2Cl5, Steropesite Tl3BiCl6, Panichiite (NH4)2SnCl6
 Chukhrovite group
 Chukhrovite-(Y) Ca3(Y,Ce)Al2(SO4)F13•10H2O, Chukhrovite-(Ce) Ca3(Ce,Y)Al2(SO4)F13•10H2O, Meniaylovite Ca4AlSi(SO4)F13•12H2O, Chukhrovite-(Nd) Ca3(Nd,Y)Al2(SO4)F13•12H2O

Category 04 
 

 Oxides and Hydroxides, Vanadates, Arsenites, Antimonites, Bismuthites, Sulfites, Iodates
 :Category:Vanadate minerals
Periclase group (Isometric: Fm3m, IMA-CNMNC discourages the use of this grouping, Mills et al. (2009))
 Periclase MgO, Bunsenite NiO, Manganosite MnO, Monteponite CdO, Lime CaO, Wustite FeO, Hongquiite* TiO
 Hematite group/ Corundum group (Rhombohedral: R-3c)
 Corundum Al2O3 (Sapphire, Ruby), Eskolaite Cr2O3, Hematite Fe2O3, Karelianite V2O3, Tistarite Ti2O3
Perovskite group
Perovskite CaTiO3, Latrappite (Ca,Na)(Nb,Ti,Fe)O3, Loparite-(Ce) (Ce,Na,Ca)2(Ti,Nb)2O6, Lueshite NaNbO3, Tausonite SrTiO3, Isolueshite (Na,La,Ca)(Nb,Ti)O3, Barioperovskite BaTiO3, Lakargiite CaZrO3
Ilmenite group
 Ilmenite Fe2+TiO3, Geikielite MgTiO3, Pyrophanite MnTiO3, Ecandrewsite (Zn,Fe2+,Mn2+)TiO3, Melanostibite Mn(Sb5+,Fe3+)O3, Brizziite-III NaSb5+O3, Akimotoite (Mg,Fe)SiO3
Rutile group (Tetragonal: P4/mnm)
 Rutile TiO2, Ilmenorutile (Ti,Nb,Fe3+)O2, Struverite? (Ti,Ta,Fe3+)O2, Pyrolusite MnO2, Cassiterite SnO2, Plattnerite PbO2, Argutite GeO2, Squawcreekite? (Fe3+,Sb 5+,W6+)O4•H2O
Multiple Oxides with O19 groups/ Magnetoplumbite group
 Hibonite (Ca,Ce)(Al,Ti,Mg)12O19, Yimengite K(Cr,Ti,Fe,Mg)12O19, Hawthorneite Ba[Ti3Cr4Fe4Mg]O19, Magnetoplumbite Pb(Fe3+,Mn3+)12O19, Haggertyite Ba[(Fe2+)6Ti5Mg]O19, Nezilovite PbZn2(Mn4+,Ti4+)2(Fe3+)8O19, Batiferrite Ba(Ti2(Fe3+)8(Fe2+)2)O19, Barioferrite Ba(Fe3+)12O19, Plumboferrite Pb2(Fe3+)(11-x)(Mn2+)xO(19-2x)  x = 1/3, IMA2009-027 (Fe,Mg)Al12O19
Cryptomelane group (Hard black, fine-grained)
 Hollandite Ba(Mn4+,Mn2+)8O16, Cryptomelane K(Mn4+,Mn2+)8O16, Manjiroite (Na,K)(Mn4+,Mn2+)8O16•nH2O, Coronadite Pb(Mn4+,Mn2+)8O16, Strontiomelane Sr(Mn4+)6Mn3+2O16, Henrymeyerite BaFe2+Ti7O16
Aeschynite group
 Aeschynite-(Ce) (Ce,Ca,Fe)(Ti,Nb)2(O,OH)6, Nioboaeschynite-(Ce) (Ce,Ca)(Nb,Ti)2(O,OH)6, Aeschynite-(Y) (Y,Ca,Fe)(Ti,Nb)2(O,OH)6, Tantalaeschynite-(Y) (Y,Ce,Ca)(Ta,Ti,Nb)2O6, Aeschynite-(Nd) (Nd,Ce)(Ti,Nb)2(O,OH)6, Nioboaeschynite-(Nd) (Nd,Ce)(Nb,Ti)2(O,OH)6, Nioboaeschynite-(Y) [(Y,REE),Ca,Th,Fe](Nb,Ti,Ta)2(O,OH)6
Crichtonite group (ABC18 T2 O38)
 Landauite NaMnZn2(Ti,Fe3+)6Ti12O38, Loveringite (Ca,Ce)(Ti,Fe3+,Cr,Mg)21O38, Crichtonite (Sr,La,Ce,Y)(Ti,Fe3+,Mn)21O38, Senaite Pb(Ti,Fe,Mn)21O38, Davidite-(La) (La,Ce,Ca)(Y,U)(Ti,Fe3+)20O38, Davidite-(Ce) (Ce,La)(Y,U)(Ti,Fe3+)20O38, Mathiasite (K,Ca,Sr)(Ti,Cr,Fe,Mg)21O38, Lindsleyite (Ba,Sr)(Ti,Cr,Fe,Mg)21O38, Dessauite (Sr,Pb)(Y,U)(Ti,Fe3+)20O38, Cleusonite Pb(U4+,U6+)(Ti,Fe2+,Fe3+)20(O,OH)38, Gramaccioliite-(Y) (Pb,Sr)(Y,Mn)Fe2(Ti,Fe)18O38

Spinel group 
 

 AB2O4
Aluminum subgroup
 Spinel MgAl2O4, Galaxite (Mn,Mg)(Al,Fe3+)2O4, Hercynite Fe2+Al2O4, Gahnite ZnAl2O4
Iron subgroup
 Magnesioferrite MgFe3+2O4, Jacobsite (Mn2+,Fe2+,Mg)(Fe3+,Mn3+)2O4, Magnetite Fe2+(Fe3+)2O4, Franklinite (Zn,Mn2+,Fe2+)(Fe3+,Mn3+)2O4, Trevorite Ni(Fe3+)2O4, Cuprospinel (Cu,Mg)(Fe3+)2O4, Brunogeierite (Ge2+,Fe2+)(Fe3+)2O4
Chromium subgroup
 Magnesiochromite MgCr2O4, Manganochromite (Mn,Fe2+)(Cr,V)2O4, Chromite Fe2+Cr2O4, Nichromite (Ni,Co,Fe2+)(Cr,Fe3+,Al)2O4, Cochromite (Co,Ni,Fe2+)(Cr,Al)2O4, Zincochromite ZnCr2O4
Vanadium subgroup
 Vuorelainenite (Mn2+,Fe2+)(V3+,Cr3+)2O4, Coulsonite Fe2+(V3+)2O4, Magnesiocoulsonite Mg(V3+)2O4
Titanium subgroup
 Qandilite (Mg,Fe2+)2(Ti,Fe3+,Al)O4, Ulvospinel Ti(Fe2+)2O4
Taaffeite group
 Magnesiotaaffeite-2N2S Mg3Al8BeO16, Magnesiotaaffeite-6N3S (Mg,Fe2+,Zn)2Al6BeO12, Ferrotaaffeite-6N3S (Fe2+,Zn,Mg)2Al6BeO12
 Kusachiite CuBi2O4, Iwakiite Mn2+(Fe3+,Mn3+)2O4, Hausmannite Mn2+(Mn3+)2O4, Hetaerolite Zn(Mn3+)2O4, Hydrohetaerolite Zn2(Mn3+)4O8•H2O, Minium (Pb2+)2Pb4+O4, Chrysoberyl BeAl2O4, Marokite Ca(Mn3+)2O4, Filipstadite (Mn2+,Mg)4Sb5+Fe 3+O8, Tegengrenite (Mg,Mn2+)2(Sb5+)0.5(Mn3+,Si,Ti)0.5O4, Yafsoanite Ca3Te2Zn3O12, Xieite FeCr2O4

Nickel-Strunz 04.DH mineral family 
IMA/CMNMC revised the Pyrochlore supergroup 2010.
 Pyrochlore supergroup 
 Pyrochlore group (D atom is Nb)
 Fluorcalciopyrochlore (Ca,[ ])2Nb2(O,OH)6F, Fluorkenopyrochlore ([ ],Na,Ce,Ca)2(Nb,Ti)2O6F, Fluornatropyrochlore (Na,REE,Ca)2Nb2(O,OH)6F, Fluorstrontiopyrochlore (Sr,[ ])2Nb2(O,OH)6F, Hydropyrochlore (H2O,[ ])2Nb2(O,OH)6(H2O), Hydroxycalciopyrochlore (Ca,[ ])2Nb2(O,OH)6(OH), Kenoplumbopyrochlore (Pb,[ ])Nb2O6([ ],O), Oxycalciopyrochlore Ca2Nb2O6O, Oxynatropyrochlore (Na,Ca,U)2Nb2O6(O,OH), Oxyplumbopyrochlore Pb2Nb2O6O, Oxyyttropyrochlore-(Y) (Y,[ ])2Nb2O6O
 Microlite group (D atom is Ta)
 Fluorcalciomicrolite (Ca,Na)2Ta2O6F, Fluornatromicrolite (Na,Ca,Bi)2Ta2O6F, Hydrokenomicrolite ([ ],H2O)2Ta2(O,OH)6H2O, Hydromicrolite (H2O,[ ])2Ta2(O,OH)6H2O, Hydroxykenomicrolite ([ ],Na,Sb3+)2Ta2O6(OH), Kenoplumbomicrolite (Pb,[ ])2Ta2O6([ ],O,OH), Oxycalciomicrolite Ca2Ta2O6O, Oxystannomicrolite Sn2Ta2O6O, Oxystibiomicrolite (Sb3+,Ca)2Ta2O6O
 Romeite group (D atom is Sb)
 Cuproromeite Cu2Sb2(O,OH)7, Fluorcalcioromeite (Ca,Sb3+)2(Sb5+,Ti)2O6F, Fluornatroromeite (Na,Ca)2Sb2(O,OH)6F, Hydroxycalcioromeite (Ca,Sb3+)2(Sb5+,Ti)2O6(OH), Oxycalcioromeite Ca2Sb2O6O, Oxyplumboromeite Pb2Sb2O6O, Stibiconite Sb3+Sb+62O6(OH) 
 Betafite group (D atom is Ti): Calciobetafite Ca2(Ti,Nb)2O6O, Oxyuranobetafite (U,Ca,[ ])2(Ti,Nb)2O6O
 Elsmoreite group (D atom is W): Hydrokenoelsmoreite [ ]2W2O6(H2O) 
Cesstibtantite group
 Cesstibtantite (Cs,Na)SbTa4O12, Natrobistantite (Na,Cs)Bi(Ta,Nb,Sb)4O12
 Brannerite-Thorutite series, Orthobrannerite-Thorutite series: 
 Brannerite (U4+,REE,Th,Ca)(Ti,Fe3+,Nb)2(O,OH)6, Orthobrannerite U4+U6+Ti4O12(OH)2, Thorutite (Th,U,Ca)Ti2(O,OH)6

Class: Hydroxides and oxides containing hydroxyl 
 
 
 Diaspore group (Orthorhombic, Pnma or Pnmd)
Diaspore AlO(OH), Goethite Fe3+O(OH), Groutite Mn3+O(OH), Montroseite (V3+,Fe3+,V4+)O(OH), Bracewellite Cr3+O(OH), Tsumgallite GaO(OH)
 Brucite group (Rhombohedral: P-3m1)
 Brucite Mg(OH)2, Amakinite (Fe2+,Mg)(OH)2, Pyrochroite Mn(OH)2, Portlandite Ca(OH)2, Theophrastite Ni(OH)2
 Wickmanite group
(Cubic or Trigonal, 2+ cations containing Sn)
 Wickmanite Mn2+Sn4+(OH)6, Schoenfliesite MgSn4+(OH)6, Natanite Fe2+Sn4+(OH)6, Vismirnovite ZnSn4+(OH)6, Burtite CaSn(OH)6, Mushistonite (Cu,Zn,Fe)Sn4+(OH)6
 (Tetragonal: P42/n)
 Stottite Fe2+Ge(OH)6, Tetrawickmanite Mn2+Sn4+(OH)6, Jeanbandyite (Fe3+,Mn2+)Sn4+(OH)6, Mopungite NaSb(OH)6

Category 05 
 

 Carbonates and Nitrates
 Calcite group (Trigonal: R-3c) 
 Calcite CaCO3, Magnesite MgCO3, Siderite Fe2+CO3, Rhodochrosite MnCO3, Spherocobaltite CoCO3, Smithsonite ZnCO3, Otavite CdCO3, Gaspeite (Ni,Mg,Fe2+)CO3
 Aragonite group (Orthorhombic: Pmcn) 
 Aragonite CaCO3, Witherite BaCO3, Strontianite SrCO3, Cerussite PbCO3
 Dolomite group
 Ankerite Ca(Fe2+,Mg,Mn2+)(CO3)2, Dolomite CaMg(CO3)2, Kutnohorite Ca(Mn,Mg,Fe)(CO3)2, Minrecordite CaZn(CO3)2
Burbankite group
Hexagonal
Burbankite (Na,Ca)3(Sr,Ba,Ce)3(CO3)5, Khanneshite (NaCa)3(Ba,Sr,Ce,Ca)3(CO3)5, Calcioburbankite Na3(Ca,REE,Sr)3(CO3)5, Sanromanite Na2CaPb3(CO3)5
Monoclinic
Rémondite-(Ce) Na3(Ce,La,Ca,Na,Sr)3(CO3)5, Petersenite-(Ce) (Na,Ca)4(Ce,La,Nd)2(CO3)5, Rémondite-(La) Na3(La,Ce,Ca)3(CO3)5
Rosasite group
Rosasite (Cu,Zn)2(CO3)(OH)2, Glaukosphaerite (Cu,Ni)2(CO3)(OH)2, Kolwezite (Cu,Co)2(CO3)(OH)2, Zincrosasite (Zn,Cu)2(CO3)(OH)2, Mcguinnessite (Mg,Cu)2(CO3)(OH)2
Malachite group
Malachite Cu2(CO3)(OH)2, Nullaginite Ni2(CO3)(OH)2, Pokrovskite Mg2(CO3)(OH)2•0.5H2O, Chukanovite Fe2(CO3)(OH)2
Ancylite group
Ancylite-(Ce) SrCe(CO3)2(OH)•H2O, Calcioancylite-(Ce) CaCe(CO3)2(OH)•H2O, Calcioancylite-(Nd) CaNd(CO3)2(OH)•H2O, Gysinite-(Nd) Pb(Nd,La)(CO3)2(OH)•H2O, Ancylite-(La) Sr(La,Ce)(CO3)2(OH)•H2O, Kozoite-(Nd) (Nd,La,Sm,Pr)(CO3)(OH), Kozoite-(La) La(CO3)(OH)
Sjogrenite-Hydrotalcite group
Sjogrenite subgroup: Hexagonal
Manasseite Mg6Al2[(OH)16|CO3]·4H2O, Barbertonite Mg6(Cr,Al)2[(OH)16|CO3]·4H2O, Sjogrenite Mg6(Fe3+)2[(OH)16|CO3]·4H2O, Zaccagnaite Zn4Al2(OH)12(CO3)•3H2O, Fougerite (Fe2+,Mg)6(Fe3+)2(OH)18·4H2O
Hydrotalcite subgroup: Rhombohedral I,  Mg6(R3+)2(OH)16CO3·4H2O, where R3+ = Al, Cr, or Fe 
Hydrotalcite Mg6Al2[(OH)16CO3]·4H2O, Stichtite Mg6Cr2[(OH)16|CO3]·4H2O, Pyroaurite Mg6Fe3+2[(OH)16|CO3]·4H2O, Desautelsite Mg6(Mn3+)2[(OH)16|CO3]·4H2O, Droninoite Ni3Fe3+Cl(OH)8•2H2O, Hydrowoodwardite Cu1−xAlx[(OH)2|(SO4)x/2]·nH2O, Iowaite Mg4Fe(OH)8OCl·4H2O
Hydrotalcite subgroup: Rhombohedral II
Reevesite Ni6(Fe3+)2(CO3)(OH)16•4H2O, Takovite Ni6Al2(OH)16(CO3,OH)•4H2O, Comblainite (Ni2+)6(Co3+)2(CO3)(OH)16•4H2O 
Tundrite group
Tundrite-(Ce) Na2Ce2TiO2(SiO4)(CO3)2, Tundrite-(Nd) Na3(Nd,La)4(Ti,Nb)2(SiO4)2(CO3)3O4(OH)•2H2O 
:Category:Nitrate minerals

Category 06 
 

 Borates
 Ludwigite group (Space group: Pbam)
 Ludwigite Mg2Fe3+BO5, Vonsenite Fe2+2Fe3+BO5, Azoproite (Mg,Fe2+)2(Fe3+,Ti,Mg)BO5, Bonaccordite Ni2Fe3+BO5, Chestermanite Mg2(Fe3+,Mg,Al,Sb5+)BO3O2, Fredrikssonite Mg2(Mn3+,Fe3+)O2(BO3)
 Boracite group (Tecto-heptaborates)
 (Orthorhombic: Rca21) 
 Boracite Mg3B7O13Cl, Ericaite (Fe2+,Mg,Mn)3B7O13Cl, Chambersite Mn3B7O13Cl
 (Trigonal: R3c)
 Congolite (Fe2+,Mg,Mn)3B7O13Cl, Trembathite (Mg,Fe2+)3B7O13Cl
 Inderite group (Neso-triborates)
 Inyoite Ca2B6O6(OH)10•8H2O, Inderborite CaMg[B3O3(OH)5]2•6H2O, Inderite MgB3O3(OH)5•5H2O, Kurnakovite Mg(H4B3O7)(OH)·5H2O, Meyerhofferite Ca2(H3B3O7)2·4H2O, Solongoite Ca2 (H3B3O7)(OH)Cl 
 Santite group (Neso-pentaborates)
 Santite KB5O6(OH)4•2(H2O), Ramanite-(Rb) Rb[B5O6(OH)4]•2H2O, Ramanite-(Cs) Cs[B5O6(OH)4]•2H2O
 Hilgardite group (Tecto-pentaborates)
 Hilgardite Ca2B5O9Cl•H2O, Kurgantaite CaSr[B5O9]Cl•H2O, IMA2007-047 Pb2[B5O9]Cl•0.5H2O
 Pringleite group 
 Pringleite Ca9B26O34(OH)24Cl4•13H2O, Ruitenbergite Ca9B26O34(OH)24Cl4•13H2O, Brianroulstonite Ca3[B5O6(OH)6](OH)Cl2•8H2O, Penobsquisite Ca2Fe2+[B9O13(OH)6]Cl•4H2O, Walkerite Ca16(Mg,Li,[ ])2[B13O17(OH)12]4Cl6•28H2O

Category 07 
 

 Sulfates, Selenates, Chromates, Molybdates, Wolframates, Niobates
Barite group 
 Barite BaSO4, Celestine SrSO4, Anglesite PbSO4 
Blodite group 
 Blodite Na2Mg(SO4)2•4H2O, Nickelblodite Na2(Ni,Mg)(SO4)2•4H2O, Leonite K2Mg(SO4)2•4H2O, Mereiterite K2Fe2+(SO4)2•4H2O, Changoite Na2Zn(SO4)2•4H2O
 Alum group, XAl(SO4)2·12H2O
 Alum-(K) KAl[SO4]2·12H2O, Alum-(Na) NaAl[SO4]2·12H2O, Tschermigite (NH4)Al(SO4)2•12H2O, Lonecreekite (NH4)(Fe3+,Al)(SO4)2•12H2O, Lanmuchangite TlAl(SO4)2•12H2O 
 Voltaite group
 Voltaite K2(Fe2+)5(Fe3+)3Al(SO4)12•18H2O, Zincovoltaite K2Zn5(Fe3+)3Al(SO4)12•18H2O, Pertlikite K2(Fe2+,Mg)2(Mg,Fe3+)4(Fe3+)2Al(SO4)12•18H2O
 Aluminite group 
 Aluminite Al2(SO4)(OH)4•7(H2O), Mangazeite Al2(SO4)(OH)4•3H2O
 Zippeite group
 Zippeite K4(UO2)6(SO4)3(OH)10•4H2O, Natrozippeite Na4(UO2)6(SO4)3(OH)10•4H2O, Magnesiozippeite Mg(H2O)3.5(UO2)2(SO4)O2, Nickelzippeite (Ni2+)2(UO2)6(SO4)3(OH)10•16H2O, Zinc-zippeite (Zn2+)2(UO2)6(SO4)3(OH)10•16H2O, Cobaltzippeite (Co2+)2(UO2)6(SO4)3(OH)10•16H2O, Marecottite Mg3(H2O)18[(UO2)4O3(SO4)2]2•10H2O, Pseudojohannite Cu6.5[(UO2)4O4(SO4)2]2(OH)5•25H2O, IMA2009-008 Y2[(UO2)8O6(SO4)4(OH)2]•26H2O
 Copiapite group 
 Copiapite Fe2+(Fe3+)4(SO4)6(OH)2•20H2O, Magnesiocopiapite Mg(Fe3+)4(SO4)6(OH)2•20H2O, Cuprocopiapite Cu(Fe3+)4(SO4)6(OH)2•20H2O, Ferricopiapite (Fe3+)2/3(Fe3+)4(SO4)6(OH)2•20H2O, Calciocopiapite Ca(Fe3+)4(SO4)6(OH)2•19H2O, Zincocopiapite Zn(Fe3+)4(SO4)6(OH)2•18H2O, Aluminocopiapite Al2/3(Fe3+)4(SO4)6O(OH)2•20H2O
 Pb, Zn tellurates
 Cheremnykhite Zn3Pb3Te4+O6(VO4)2, Kuksite Pb3Zn3Te6+O6(PO4)2, Dugganite Pb3Zn3Te(As,V,Si)2(O,OH)14, Joelbruggerite Pb3Zn3Sb5+As2O13(OH)
 "Halotrichite" supergroup 
 Hydrated acid and sulfates where A(B)2(XO4)4·H2O
 Halotrichite group
 Pickeringite MgAl2(SO4)4•22H2O, Halotrichite Fe2+Al2(SO4)4•22H2O, Apjohnite MnAl2(SO4)4•22H2O, Dietrichite (Zn,Fe2+,Mn)Al2(SO4)4•22H2O, Bilinite Fe2+(Fe3+)2(SO4)4•22H2O, Redingtonite (Fe2+,Mg,Ni)(Cr,Al)2(SO4)4•22H2O, Wupatkiite (Co,Mg,Ni)Al2(SO4)4•22H2O
 Ransomite Cu(Fe3+)2(SO4)4•6H2O, Romerite Fe2+(Fe3+)2(SO4)4•14H2O, Lishizhenite Zn(Fe3+)2(SO4)4•14H2O

"Kieserite" supergroup 
 Hydrated acid and sulfates where AXO4·H2O
 Kieserite group 
 Kieserite MgSO4•H2O, Szomolnokite Fe2+SO4•H2O, Szmikite MnSO4•H2O, Poitevinite (Cu,Fe2+,Zn)SO4•H2O, Gunningite (Zn,Mn)SO4•H2O, Dwornikite (Ni,Fe2+)SO4•H2O, Cobaltkieserite CoSO4•H2O
 Rozenite group (Monoclinic) 
 Rozenite Fe2+SO4•4H2O, Starkeyite MgSO4•4H2O, Ilesite (Mn,Zn,Fe2+)SO4•4H2O, Aplowite (Co,Mn,Ni)SO4•4H2O, Boyleite (Zn,Mg)SO4•4H2O, IMA2002-034 CdSO4•4H2O 
 Chalchanthite group (Triclinic: P-1) 
 Chalcanthite CuSO4•5H2O, Siderotil Fe2+SO4•5H2O, Pentahydrite MgSO4•5H2O, Jokokuite MnSO4•5H2O
 Hexahydrite group (Space group: C2/c) 
 Hexahydrite MgSO4•6H2O, Bianchite (Zn,Fe2+)(SO4)•6H2O, Ferrohexahydrite Fe2+SO4•6H2O, Nickelhexahydrite (Ni,Mg,Fe2+)(SO4)•6H2O, Moorhouseite (Co,Ni,Mn)SO4•6H2O, Chvaleticeite (Mn2+,Mg)SO4•6H2O 
 Melanterite group (Heptahydrates, Monoclinic: P21/c) 
 Melanterite Fe2+SO4•7H2O, Boothite CuSO4•7H2O, Zincmelanterite (Zn,Cu,Fe2+)SO4•7H2O, Bieberite CoSO4•7H2O, Mallardite Mn2+SO4•7H2O, Alpersite (Mg,Cu)SO4•7H2O  
 Epsomite group
 Epsomite MgSO4·7H2O, Goslarite ZnSO4·7H2O, Morenosite NiSO4·7H2O
 Minasragrite group
 (Monclinic and Triclinic) 
 Minasragrite VO(SO4)•5H2O, Bobjonesite VO(SO4)H2O3, Anorthominasragrite V4+O(SO4)H2O5
 (Orthorhombic) 
 Stanleyite (V4+O)SO4•6(H2O), Orthominasragrite VO(SO4)•5(H2O) 
 Bassanite 2CaSO4•H2O, Gypsum CaSO4•2H2O, Sanderite MgSO4•2H2O, Bonattite CuSO4•3H2O, Retgersite NiSO4•6H2O, Meridianiite MgSO4•11H2O

Alunite supergroup - Part I 
 :Category:Alunite group, A1+(B[3])3(SO4)2(OH)6
 Alunite KAl3[(OH)3|SO4]2, Ammonioalunite (NH4)Al3[(OH)3|SO4]2, Ammoniojarosite (NH4)(Fe3+)3(SO4)2(OH)6, Argentojarosite Ag(Fe3+)3(SO4)2(OH)6, Beaverite-Cu Pb(Fe3+,Cu)3(SO4)2(OH)6 (Fe3+:Cu ≈ 2:1), Beaverite-Zn Pb((Fe3+)2Zn)(SO4)2(OH)6, Dorallcharite (Tl,K)(Fe3+)3(SO4)2(OH)6, Huangite Ca0.5Al3(SO4)2(OH)6, Hydroniumjarosite (H3O)(Fe3+)3(SO4)2(OH)6, Jarosite K(Fe3+)3[(OH)3|SO4]2, Natroalunite (Na,K)Al3[(OH)3|SO4], Natrojarosite Na(Fe3+)3(SO4)2(OH)6, Osarizawaite PbCuAl2(SO4)2(OH)6, Plumbojarosite Pb(Fe3+)6(SO4)4(OH)12, Schlossmacherite (H3O,Ca)Al3(AsO4,SO4)2(OH)6, Walthierite Ba0.5Al3(SO4)2(OH)6, Mills et al. (2009)

Category 08 
 

 Phosphates, Arsenates, Polyvanadates
 :Category:Arsenate minerals

Class: Anhydrous phosphates 
 Triphylite group 
 Triphylite LiFe2+PO4, Lithiophilite LiMnPO4, Natrophilite NaMnPO4
 Retzian series
 Retzian-(Ce) Mn2Ce(AsO4)(OH)4, Retzian-(Nd) Mn2(Nd,Ce,La)(AsO4)(OH)4, Retzian-(La) (Mn,Mg)2(La,Ce,Nd)(AsO4)(OH)4

"Alluaudite-Wyllieite" supergroup 
Anhydrous phosphates, etc. (A+ B2+)5 (XO4)3
Berzeliite group
Berzeliite (Ca,Na)3(Mg,Mn)2(AsO4)3, Manganberzeliite (Ca,Na)3(Mn,Mg)2(AsO4)3, Palenzonaite (Ca,Na)3Mn2+(V5+,As5+,Si)3O12, Schaferite NaCa2Mg2(VO4)3
Alluaudite-Wyllieite group (Alluaudite subgroup I) 
Caryinite (Na,Pb)(Ca,Na)(Ca,Mn2+)(Mn2+,Mg)2(AsO4)3, Arseniopleite (Ca,Na)(Na,Pb)Mn2+(Mn2+,Mg,Fe2+)2(AsO4)3
Alluaudite-Wyllieite group (Alluaudite subgroup II/ Hagendorfite subgroup)
Ferrohagendorfite* (Na,Ca)2Fe2+(Fe2+,Fe3+)2(PO4)3, Hagendorfite NaCaMn(Fe2+,Fe3+,Mg)2(PO4)3, Varulite NaCaMn(Mn,Fe2+,Fe3+)2(PO4)3, Maghagendorfite NaMgMn(Fe2+,Fe3+)2(PO4)3, Ferroalluaudite NaCaFe2+(Fe2+,Mn,Fe3+,Mg)2(PO4)3, Alluaudite NaCaFe2+(Mn,Fe2+,Fe3+,Mg)2(PO4)3, Odanielite Na(Zn,Mg)3H2(AsO4)3, Johillerite Na(Mg,Zn)3Cu(AsO4)3, Nickenichite Na0.8Ca0.4(Mg,Fe3+,Al)3Cu0.4(AsO4)3, Yazganite Na(Fe3+)2(Mg,Mn)(AsO4)3•H2O, IMA2008-054 NaCaMn2(PO4)[PO3(OH)]2, IMA2008-064 Na16(Mn2+)25Al8(PO4)30
Alluaudite-Wyllieite group (Wyllieite subgroup)
Ferrowyllieite (Na,Ca,Mn)(Fe2+,Mn)(Fe2+,Fe3+,Mg)Al(PO4)3, Wyllieite (Na,Ca,Mn2+)(Mn2+,Fe2+)(Fe 2+, Fe3+,Mg)Al(PO4)3, Rosemaryite (Na,Ca,Mn2+)(Mn2+,Fe2+)(Fe3+,Fe2+,Mg)Al(PO4)3, Qingheiite Na2(Mn2+,Mg,Fe2+)(Al,Fe3+)(PO4)3, Bobfergusonite Na2(Mn2+)5Fe3+Al(PO4)6, Bradaczekite NaCu4(AsO4)3, Ferrorosemaryite [ ]NaFe2+Fe3+Al(PO4)3
Fillowite group
Fillowite Na2Ca(Mn,Fe2+)7(PO4)6, Johnsomervilleite Na2Ca(Mg,Fe2+,Mn)7(PO4)6, Chladniite Na2Ca(Mg,Fe2+)7(PO4)6, Galileiite Na(Fe2+)4(PO4)3, Xenophyllite Na4Fe7(PO4)6, Stornesite-(Y) (Y, Ca)[ ]2Na6(Ca,Na)8(Mg,Fe)43(PO4)36
 Nabiasite BaMn9[(V,As)O4]6(OH)2

"Whitlockite" supergroup 
 Anhydrous phosphates, etc. (A+ B2+)3 (XO4)2
 Sarcopside group
 Sarcopside (Fe2+,Mn,Mg)3(PO4)2, Farringtonite Mg3(PO4)2, Chopinite (Mg,Fe)3(PO4)2
 Whitlockite group 
 Whitlockite Ca9(Mg,Fe2+)(PO4)6(PO3OH), Strontiowhitlockite Sr7(Mg,Ca)3(PO4)6[PO3(OH)], Merrillite-(Ca)* (Ca,[ ])19Mg2(PO4)14, Merrillite Ca18Na2Mg2(PO4)14, Merrillite-(Y)* Ca16Y2Mg2(PO4)14, Ferromerrillite Ca9NaFe(PO4)7, Tuite Ca3(PO4)2, Bobdownsite Ca9Mg(PO3F)(PO4)6 
 Xanthiosite Ni3(AsO4)2, Graftonite (Fe2+,Mn,Ca)3(PO4)2, Beusite (Mn2+,Fe2+,Ca,Mg)3(PO4)2, Stanfieldite Ca4(Mg,Fe2+,Mn)5(PO4)6, Hurlbutite CaBe2(PO4)2, Stranskiite Zn2Cu2+(AsO4)2, Keyite (Cu2+)3(Zn,Cu)4Cd2(AsO4)6•2H2O, Lammerite Cu3[(As,P)O4]2, Mcbirneyite Cu3(VO4)2, Tillmannsite (Ag3Hg)(V,As)O4, IMA2009-002 Cu3(AsO4)2

"Monazite" supergroup 
 Anhydrous phosphates, etc. A+ XO4 
 Berlinite group
 Berlinite AlPO4, Alarsite AlAsO4, Rodolicoite Fe3+PO4
 Monazite group (Monoclinic: P21/n) 
Monazite-(Ce) (Ce,La,Nd,Th)PO4, Monazite-(La) (La,Ce,Nd)PO4, Cheralite-(Ce)? (Ce,Ca,Th)(P,Si)O4, Brabantite? CaTh(PO4)2, Monazite-(Nd) (Nd,Ce,La)(P,Si)O4, Gasparite-(Ce) CeAsO4, Monazite-(Sm) SmPO4
 Lithiophosphate group
 Lithiophosphate Li3PO4, Olympite LiNa5(PO4)2, Nalipoite NaLi2PO4
 Zenotime group (Tetragonal: I41/amd)
 Xenotime-(Y) YPO4, Chernovite-(Y) YAsO4, Wakefieldite-(Y) YVO4, Wakefieldite-(Ce) (Ce3+,Pb2+,Pb4+)VO4, Pretulite ScPO4, Xenotime-(Yb) YbPO4, Wakefieldite-(La) LaVO4, Wakefieldite-(Nd) NdVO4
 Heterosite Fe3+PO4, Purpurite Mn3+PO4, Rooseveltite BiAsO4, Tetrarooseveltite BiAsO4, Pucherite BiVO4, Clinobisvanite BiVO4, Dreyerite BiVO4, Ximengite BiPO4, Kosnarite K(Zr4+)2(PO4)3, Petewilliamsite (Ni,Co,Cu)30(As2O7)15

"Adelite" supergroup 
 Anhydrous phosphates, etc. containing hydroxyl or halogen where (A B)2 (XO4) Zq 
 Adelite group 
 Adelite CaMg(AsO4)(OH), Conichalcite CaCu(AsO4)(OH), Austinite CaZn(AsO4)(OH), Duftite-beta? PbCu(AsO4)(OH), Gabrielsonite PbFe2+(AsO4)(OH), Tangeite CaCu(VO4)(OH), Nickelaustinite Ca(Ni,Zn)(AsO4)(OH), Cobaltaustinite CaCo(AsO4)(OH), Arsendescloizite PbZn(AsO4)(OH), Gottlobite CaMg(VO4,AsO4)(OH)
 Descloizite group 
 Descloizite PbZn(VO4)(OH), Mottramite PbCu(VO4)(OH), Pyrobelonite PbMn(VO4)(OH), Cechite Pb(Fe2+,Mn)(VO4)(OH), Duftite-alpha PbCu(AsO4)(OH)
 Herderite group 
 Herderite CaBe(PO4)F, Hydroxylherderite CaBe(PO4)(OH), Vayrynenite MnBe(PO4)(OH,F), Bergslagite CaBe(AsO4)(OH)
 Lacroixite group
 Lacroixite NaAl(PO4)F, Durangite NaAl(AsO4)F, Maxwellite NaFe3+(AsO4)F
 Tilasite group 
 Tilasite CaMg(AsO4)F, Isokite CaMg(PO4)F, Panasqueiraite CaMg(PO4)(OH,F)
 Amblygonite group
 Amblygonite (Li,Na)Al(PO4)(F,OH), Montebrasite? LiAl(PO4)(OH,F), Natromontebrasite? (Na,Li)Al(PO4)(OH,F)
 Dussertite group
 Dussertite Ba(Fe3+)3(AsO4)2(OH)5, Florencite-(Ce) CeAl3(PO4)2(OH)6, Florencite-(La) (La,Ce)Al3(PO4)2(OH)6, Florencite-(Nd) (Nd,Ce)Al3(PO4)2(OH)6
 Arsenoflorencite group
 Arsenoflorencite-(Ce) (Ce,La)Al3(AsO4)2(OH)6, Arsenoflorencite-(Nd)* (Nd,La,Ce,Ba)(Al,Fe3+)3(AsO4,PO4)2(OH)6, Arsenoflorencite-(La)* (La,Sr)Al3(AsO4,SO4,PO4)2(OH)6, Graulichite-(Ce) Ce(Fe3+)3(AsO4)2(OH)6
 Waylandite group 
 Waylandite BiAl3(PO4)2(OH)6, Eylettersite (Th,Pb)(1-x)Al3(PO4,SiO4)2(OH)6 (?), Zairite Bi(Fe3+,Al)3(PO4)2(OH)6, Arsenogorceixite BaAl3AsO3(OH)(AsO4,PO4)(OH,F)6
 Babefphite BaBe(PO4)(F,O), Brazilianite NaAl3(PO4)2(OH)4, Tavorite LiFe3+(PO4)(OH), Vesignieite Cu3Ba(VO4)2(OH)2, Bayldonite (Cu,Zn)3Pb(AsO3OH)2(OH)2, Curetonite Ba4Al3Ti(PO4)4(O,OH)6, Thadeuite (Ca,Mn2+)(Mg,Fe2+,Mn3+)3(PO4)2(OH,F)2, Leningradite Pb(Cu2+)3(VO4)2Cl2, Arctite Na2Ca4(PO4)3F, Wilhelmkleinite Zn(Fe3+)3(AsO4)2(OH)2, Artsmithite Hg+4Al(PO4)1.74(OH)1.78

"Olivenite" supergroup 
 Anhydrous phosphates, etc. containing hydroxyl or halogen where (A)2 (XO4) Zq 
 Zwieselite group
 Zwieselite (Fe2+,Mn)2(PO4)F, Triplite (Mn,Fe2+,Mg,Ca)2(PO4)(F,OH), Magniotriplite? (Mg,Fe2+,Mn)2(PO4)F 
 Wagnerite group 
 Wagnerite (Mg,Fe2+)2(PO4)F, Hydroxylwagnerite Mg2(PO4)(OH)
 Wolfeite group
 Wolfeite (Fe2+,Mn2+)2(PO4)(OH), Triploidite (Mn,Fe2+)2(PO4)(OH), Sarkinite (Mn2+)2(AsO4)(OH), Stanekite Fe3+(Mn,Fe2+,Mg)(PO4)O, Joosteite (Mn2+,Mn3+,Fe3+)2(PO4)O
 Satterlyite group 
 Satterlyite (Fe2+,Mg)2(PO4)(OH), Holtedahlite Mg12(PO3OH,CO3)(PO4)5(OH,O)6
 Olivenite group 
 Olivenite subgroup
 Adamite Zn2(AsO4)(OH), Eveite (Mn2+)2[OH|AsO4], Libethenite Cu2PO4OH, Olivenite Cu2[OH|AsO4], Zincolivenite CuZn(AsO4)(OH), Zincolibethenite CuZn(PO4)OH
 Tarbuttite subgroup
 Tarbuttite Zn2PO4OH,  Paradamite Zn2[OH|AsO4]
 Althausite Mg2(PO4)(OH,F,O), Augelite Al2(PO4)(OH)3, Arsenobismite? Bi2(AsO4)(OH)3, Angelellite (Fe3+)4(AsO4)2O3, Spodiosite? Ca2(PO4)F

"Arrojadite" supergroup 
Anhydrous phosphates, etc. containing hydroxyl or halogen where (A B)m (XO4)4 Zq
 Palermoite group
 Palermoite (Sr,Ca)(Li,Na)2Al4(PO4)4(OH)4, Bertossaite Li2CaAl4(PO4)4(OH)4
 Arrojadite group (Arrojadite subgroup) (Al in Al site, OH in W site, Fe in M site)
 Arrojadite KNa4Ca(Mn2+)4(Fe2+)10Al(PO4)12(OH,F)2, Arrojadite-(KNa) KNa4Ca(Fe,Mn,Mg)13Al(PO4)11(PO3OH)(OH,F)2, Arrojadite-(KFe) KNa2CaNa2(Fe2+,Mn,Mg)13Al(PO4)11(PO3OH)(OH,F)2, Arrojadite-(NaFe) NaNa2CaNa2(Fe2+,Mn,Mg)13Al(PO4)11(PO3OH)(OH,F)2, Arrojadite-(BaNa) BaFe2+Na2Ca(Fe2+,Mn,Mg)13Al(PO4)11(PO3OH)(OH,F)2, Arrojadite-(BaFe) (Ba,K,Pb)Na3(Ca,Sr)(Fe2+,Mg,Mn)14Al(PO4)11(PO3OH)(OH,F)2, Arrojadite-(SrFe) SrFe2+Na2Ca(Fe2+,Mn,Mg)13Al(PO4)11(PO3OH)(OH,F)2, Arrojadite-(PbFe) PbFe2+Na2Ca(Fe2+,Mn,Mg)13Al(PO4)11(PO3OH)(OH,F)2
 Arrojadite group (Fluorarrojadite subgroup) (Al in Al site, F in W site, Fe in M site)
 Fluorarrojadite-(KNa) KNa4Ca(Fe,Mn,Mg)13Al(PO4)11(PO3OH)(F,OH)2, Fluorarrojadite-(BaNa) BaFe2+Na2Ca(Fe2+,Mn,Mg)13Al(PO4)11(PO3OH)(F,OH)2, Fluorarrojadite-(BaFe) (Ba,K,Pb)Na3(Ca,Sr)(Fe2+,Mg,Mn)14Al(PO4)11(PO3OH)(F,OH)2
 Arrojadite group (Dickinsonite subgroup) (Fe in Al site, OH in W site, Fe in M site)
 Dickinsonite? KNa4Ca(Mn2+,Fe2+)14Al(PO4)12(OH)2, Dickinsonite-(KMnNa) KNaMnNa3Ca(Mn,Fe,Mg)13Al(PO4)11(PO4)(OH,F)2, Dickinsonite-(KNaNa) KNaNa4Ca(Mn,Fe,Mg)13Al(PO4)11(PO4)(OH,F)2, Dickinsonite-(KNa) KNa4Ca(Mn,Fe,Mg)13Al(PO4)11(PO4)(OH,F)2, Dickinsonite-(NaNa) Na2Na4Ca(Mn,Fe,Mg)13Al(PO4)11(PO4)(OH,F)2
 Ferri-arrojadite-(BaNa) BaFe2+Na2Ca(Fe2+,Mn,Mg)13Al(PO4)11(PO3OH)(F,OH)2
 Lulzacite Sr2Fe2+(Fe2+,Mg)2Al4(PO4)4(OH)10

"Apatite" supergroup 
Anhydrous phosphates, etc. containing hydroxyl or halogen where (A)5 (XO4)3 Zq
 Morelandite group
 Morelandite (Ba,Ca,Pb)5(AsO4,PO4)3Cl, Alforsite Ba5(PO4)3Cl 
 Clinomimetite group
 Clinomimetite Pb5(AsO4)3Cl, Apatite-(CaOH)-M (Ca,Na)5[(P,S)O4]3(OH,Cl)
 Apatite group
 Apatite* Ca5(PO4)3(OH,F,Cl), Apatite-(CaF) Ca5(PO4)3F, Apatite-(CaCl) Ca5(PO4)3Cl, Apatite-(CaOH) Ca5(PO4)3(OH), Carbonate-fluorapatite? Ca5(PO4,CO3)3F, Carbonate-hydroxylapatite? Ca5(PO4,CO3)3(OH), Belovite-(Ce) (Sr,Ce,Na,Ca)5(PO4)3(OH), Belovite-(La) (Sr,La,Ce,Ca)5(PO4)3(F,OH), Kuannersuite-(Ce) Ba6Na2REE2(PO4)6FCl, Apatite-(SrOH) (Sr,Ca)5(PO4)3(F,OH), Fluorcaphite (Ca,Sr,Ce,Na)5(PO4)3F, Deloneite-(Ce) NaCa2SrCe(PO4)3F, Phosphohedyphane Ca2Pb3(PO4)3Cl, IMA2008-009 Sr5(PO4)3F, IMA2008-068 Ca2Pb3(PO4)3F
 Svabite group
 Svabite Ca5(AsO4)3F, Turneaureite Ca5[(As,P)O4]3Cl, Johnbaumite Ca5(AsO4)3(OH), Fermorite (Ca,Sr)5(AsO4,PO4)3(OH)
 Hedyphane Ca2Pb3(AsO4)3Cl, Phosphohedyphane Ca2Pb3(PO4)3Cl
 Pyromorphite group
 Pyromorphite Pb5(PO4)3Cl, Mimetite Pb5(AsO4)3Cl, Vanadinite Pb5(VO4)3Cl, Hydroxylpyromorphite Pb5(PO4)3OH

"Rockbridgeite" supergroup 
Anhydrous phosphates, etc. containing hydroxyl or halogen where (A B)5 (XO4)3 Zq
 Kulanite group
 Kulanite Ba(Fe2+,Mn,Mg)2Al2(PO4)3(OH)3, Penikisite BaMg2Al2(PO4)3(OH)3, Bjarebyite (Ba,Sr)(Mn2+,Fe2+,Mg)2Al2(PO4)3(OH)3, Perloffite Ba(Mn,Fe2+)2(Fe3+)2(PO4)3(OH)3, Johntomaite Ba(Fe2+,Ca,Mn2+)2(Fe3+)2(PO4)3(OH)3
 Rockbridgeite group
 Rockbridgeite (Fe2+,Mn)(Fe3+)4(PO4)3(OH)5, Frondelite Mn2+(Fe3+)4(PO4)3(OH)5, Plimerite Zn(Fe3+)4(PO4)3(OH)5
 Griphite Ca(Mn,Na,Li)6Fe2+Al2(PO4)6(F,OH)2

"Lazulite" supergroup 
 Anhydrous phosphates, etc. containing hydroxyl or halogen where (A2+ B2+)3 (XO4)2 Zq 
 Lazulite group 
 Lazulite MgAl2(PO4)2(OH)2, Scorzalite (Fe2+,Mg)Al2(PO4)2(OH)2, Hentschelite Cu2+(Fe3+)2(PO4)2(OH)2, Barbosalite Fe2+(Fe3+)2(PO4)2(OH)2
 Lipscombite group
 Lipscombite (Fe2+,Mn2+)(Fe3+)2(PO4)2(OH)2, Zinclipscombite Zn(Fe3+)2(PO4)2(OH)2
 Goedkenite group
 Goedkenite (Sr,Ca)2Al(PO4)2(OH), Bearthite Ca2Al(PO4)2(OH), Gamagarite Ba2(Fe3+,Mn3+)(VO4)2(OH), Tokyoite Ba2Mn(VO4)2(OH) 
 Carminite group
 Carminite Pb(Fe3+)2(AsO4)2(OH)2, Sewardite Ca(Fe3+)2(AsO4)2(OH)2
 Mounanaite group
 Mounanaite Pb(Fe3+)2(VO4)2(OH)2, Krettnichite Pb(Mn3+)2(VO4)2(OH)2
 Preisingerite group
 Preisingerite Bi3(AsO4)2O(OH), Schumacherite Bi3[(V,As,P)O4]2O(OH)
 Jagowerite BaAl2(PO4)2(OH)2, Melonjosephite CaFe2+Fe3+(PO4)2(OH), Samuelsonite (Ca,Ba)Ca8(Fe2+,Mn)4Al2(PO4)10(OH)2, Petitjeanite (Bi3+)3(PO4)2O(OH), Drugmanite Pb2(Fe3+,Al)H(PO4)2(OH)2

Class: Hydrated phosphates 
Hureaulite group 
Hureaulite Mn5(PO3OH)2(PO4)2•4H2O, Sainfeldite Ca5(AsO3OH)2(AsO4)2•4H2O, Villyaellenite (Mn2+)5(AsO3OH)2(AsO4)2•4H2O, IMA2008-047 Cd3Zn2(AsO3OH)2(AsO4)2•4H2O, IMA2008-066 Mn5(H2O)4(AsO3OH)2(AsO4)2
Lindackerite group
Lindackerite CuCu4(AsO4)2(AsO3OH)2•~9H2O, Braithwaiteite NaCu5(Ti,Sb)2O2(AsO4)4[AsO3(OH)]2•8H2O, Veselovskyite (Zn,Cu,Co)Cu4(AsO4)2(AsO3OH)2•9H2O, IMA2008-010 CaCu4(AsO4)2(AsO3OH)2•10H2O 
Struvite group 
Struvite (NH4)MgPO4•6H2O, Struvite-(K) KMg(PO4)•6H2O, Hazenite KNaMg2(PO4)2•14H2O
Autunite group 
Formula: A(UO2)2(XO4)2·(10-12)H2O 
A = Cu, Ca, Ba, or Mg; X = P or As.  
Autunite Ca(UO2)2(PO4)2•(10-12)H2O, Heinrichite Ba(UO2)2(AsO4)2•(10-12)H2O, Kahlerite Fe2+(UO2)2(AsO4)2•(10-12)H2O, Novacekite-I Mg(UO2)2(AsO4)2•12H2O, Sabugalite HAl(UO2)4(PO4)4•16H2O, Saleeite Mg(UO2)2(PO4)2•10H2O, Torbernite Cu(UO2)2(PO4)2•(8-12)H2O, Uranocircite Ba(UO2)2(PO4)2•12H2O, Uranospinite Ca(UO2)2(AsO4)2•10H2O, Zeunerite Cu(UO2)2(AsO4)2•(10-16)H2O 
Meta-autunite group
Formula: A(UO2)2(XO4)2·nH2O (n = 6, 7 or 8) 
A = Cu, Ca, Ba, or Mg and X = P or As.
Abernathyite K2(UO2)2(AsO4)2·6H2O, Bassetite Fe2+(UO2)2(PO4)2·8H2O, Chernikovite (H3O)2(UO2)2(PO4)2·6H2O, Lehnerite Mn2+(UO2)2(PO4)2·8H2O, Meta-ankoleite K2(UO2)2(PO4)2·6H2O, Meta-autunite Ca(UO2)2(PO4)2·(6-8)H2O, Metakahlerite Fe2+(UO2)2(AsO4)2•8H2O, Metakirchheimerite Co(UO2)2(AsO4)2•8H2O, Metalodevite Zn(UO2)2(AsO4)2•10H2O, Metanovacekite Mg(UO2)2(AsO4)2•(4-8)H2O, Metatorbernite Cu(UO2)2(PO4)2•8H2O, Metauranocircite Ba(UO2)2(PO4)2•(6-8)H2O, Metauranospinite Ca(UO2)2(AsO4)2•8H2O, Metazeunerite Cu(UO2)2(AsO4)2•8H2O, Natrouranospinite (Na2,Ca)(UO2)2(AsO4)2•5H2O, Sodium Meta-autunite Na2(UO2)2(PO4)2•(6-8)H2O, Uramarsite (NH4,H3O)2(UO2)2(AsO4,PO4)2•6H2O, Uramphite (NH4)(UO2)(PO4)•3H2O 
Vivianite group 
Vivianite (Fe2+)3(PO4)2•8H2O, Baricite (Mg,Fe2+)3(PO4)2•8H2O, Erythrite Co3(AsO4)2•8H2O, Annabergite Ni3(AsO4)2•8H2O, Köttigite Zn3(AsO4)2•8H2O, Parasymplesite (Fe2+)3(AsO4)2•8H2O, Hornesite Mg3(AsO4)2•8H2O, Arupite (Ni,Fe2+)3(PO4)2•8H2O, Pakhomovskyite Co3(PO4)2•8H2O
Walpurgite group
Walpurgite Bi4(UO2)(AsO4)2O4•2H2O, Orthowalpurgite (UO2)Bi4O4(AsO4)2•2H2O, Phosphowalpurgite (UO2)Bi4(PO4)O4•2H2O 
Roscherite group 
Roscherite Ca(Mn2+,Fe2+)5Be4(PO4)6(OH)4•6H2O, Zanazziite Ca2(Mg,Fe2+)(Mg,Fe2+,Al,Mn,Fe3+)4Be4(PO4)6(OH)4•6H2O, Greifensteinite Ca2Be4(Fe2+,Mn)5(PO4)6(OH)4•6H2O, Atencioite Ca2Fe2+[ ]Mg2(Fe2+)2Be4(PO4)6(OH)4•6H2O, Guimaraesite Ca2(Zn,Mg,Fe)5Be4(PO4)6(OH)4•6H2O, Footemineite Ca2Mn2+(Mn2+)2(Mn2+)2Be4(PO4)6(OH)4•6H2O, Ruifrancoite Ca2([ ],Mn)2(Fe3+,Mn,Mg)4Be4(PO4)6(OH)4•6H2O
Pharmacosiderite group 
Pharmacosiderite K(Fe3+)4(AsO4)3(OH)4•(6-7H)2O, Alumopharmacosiderite KAl4(AsO4)3(OH)4•6•5H2O, Bariopharmacosiderite Ba(Fe3+)4(AsO4)3(OH)5•5H2O, Barium-alumopharmacosiderite? BaAl4(AsO4)3(OH)5•5H2O, Natropharmacosiderite (Na,K)2(Fe3+)4(AsO4)3(OH)5•7H2O 
08.CE.75 group
Malhmoodite FeZr(PO4)2·4H2O, Zigrasite ZnZr(PO4)2·4H2O, Unnamed (Ca-analogue of zigrasite) CaZr(PO4)2·4H2O 
 "Variscite" supergroup 
Hydrated phosphates, etc. where A3+ XO4 · H2O 
Variscite group
Variscite AlPO4•2H2O, Strengite Fe3+PO4•2H2O, Scorodite Fe3+AsO4•2H2O, Mansfieldite AlAsO4•2H2O, Yanomamite In(AsO4)•2H2O 
 Metavariscite group 
Metavariscite AlPO4•2H2O, Phosphosiderite Fe3+PO4•2H2O, Kolbeckite ScPO4•2H2O
Rhabdophane group
Rhabdophane-(Ce) (Ce,La)PO4•H2O, Rhabdophane-(La) (La,Ce)PO4•H2O, Rhabdophane-(Nd) (Nd,Ce,La)PO4•H2O, Grayite (Th,Pb,Ca)PO4•H2O, Brockite (Ca,Th,Ce)(PO4)•H2O, Tristramite (Ca,U4+,Fe3+)(PO4,SO4)•2H2O 
Ningyoite group
Ningyoite (U,Ca,Ce)2(PO4)2•(1-2)H2O, Lermontovite U4+(PO4)(OH)•H2O (?), Vyacheslavite U4+(PO4)(OH)•2.5H2O
Koninckite Fe3+PO4•3H2O (?), Kankite Fe3+AsO4•3.5H2O, Steigerite AlVO4•3H2O, Churchite-(Y) YPO4•2H2O, Churchite-(Nd) Nd(PO4)•2H2O, Parascorodite Fe3+AsO4•2H2O, Serrabrancaite MnPO4•H2O
"Mixite" supergroup
Hydrated phosphates, etc., containing hydroxyl or halogen where (A)2 (XO4) Zq · H2O
 Mixite group (Arsenate series) 
 Mixite BiCu6(AsO4)3(OH)6•3H2O, Agardite-(Y) (Y,Ca)Cu6(AsO4)3(OH)6•3H2O, Agardite-(La) (La,Ca)Cu6(AsO4)3(OH)6•3H2O, Agardite-(Nd) (Pb,Nd,Y,La,Ca)Cu6(AsO4)3(OH)6•3H2O, Agardite-(Dy) (Dy,La,Ca)Cu6(AsO4)3(OH)6•3H2O, Agardite-(Ca) CaCu6(AsO4)3(OH)6•3H2O, Agardite-(Ce) (Ce,Ca)Cu6(AsO4)3(OH)6•3H2O, Goudeyite (Al,Y)Cu6(AsO4)3(OH)6•3H2O, Zalesiite (Ca,Y)Cu6[(AsO4)2(AsO3OH)(OH)6]•3H2O, Plumboagardite (Pb,REE,Ca)Cu6(AsO4)3(OH)6•3H2O 
 Mixite group (Phosphate series) 
Petersite-(Y) (Y,Ce,Nd,Ca)Cu6(PO4)3(OH)6•3H2O, Calciopetersite CaCu6[(PO4)2(PO3OH)(OH)6]•3H2O 
Zapatalite Cu3Al4(PO4)3(OH)9•4H2O, Juanitaite (Cu,Ca,Fe)10Bi(AsO4)4(OH)11•2H2O

"Brackebushite" supergroup 
Hydrated phosphates, etc. where A2+ (B2+)2 (XO4) · H2O
Fairfieldite subgroup 
Fairfieldite Ca2(Mn,Fe2+)(PO4)2•2H2O, Messelite Ca2(Fe2+,Mn)(PO4)2•2H2O, Collinsite Ca2(Mg,Fe2+)(PO4)2•2H2O, Cassidyite Ca2(Ni,Mg)(PO4)2•2H2O, Talmessite Ca2Mg(AsO4)2•2H2O, Gaitite Ca2Zn(AsO4)2•2H2O, Roselite-beta Ca2(Co,Mg)(AsO4)2•2H2O, Parabrandtite Ca2Mn2+(AsO4)•2H2O, Hillite Ca2(Zn, Mg)[PO4]2•2H2O, Nickeltalmessite Ca2Ni(AsO4)2•2H2O 
Roselite subgroup 
Roselite Ca2(Co,Mg)(AsO4)2•2H2O, Brandtite Ca2(Mn,Mg)(AsO4)2•2H2O, Zincroselite Ca2Zn(AsO4)2•2H2O, Wendwilsonite Ca2(Mg,Co)(AsO4)2•2H2O, Manganlotharmeyerite Ca(Mn3+,Mg,)2(AsO4)2(OH,H2O)2 
Brackebushite group 
Brackebuschite Pb2(Mn,Fe2+)(VO4)2(OH), Arsenbrackebuschite Pb2(Fe2+,Zn)(AsO4)2•H2O, Feinglosite Pb2(Zn,Fe)[(As,S)O4]2•H2O, Calderonite Pb2Fe3+(VO4)2(OH), Bushmakinite Pb2Al(PO4)(VO4)(OH)
Helmutwinklerite subgroup 
Tsumcorite PbZnFe2+(AsO4)2•H2O, Helmutwinklerite PbZn2(AsO4)2•2H2O, Thometzekite Pb(Cu,Zn)2(AsO4)2•2H2O, Mawbyite Pb(Fe3+Zn)2(AsO4)2(OH,H2O)2, Rappoldite Pb(Co,Ni,Zn,)2(AsO4)2•2H2O, Schneebergite Bi(Co,Ni)2(AsO4)2(OH,H2O)2, Nickelschneebergite Bi(Ni,Co)2(AsO4)2(OH,H2O)2, Cobalttsumcorite Pb(Co,Fe)2(AsO4)2(OH,H2O)2 
Unnamed group
Wicksite NaCa2(Fe2+,Mn2+)4MgFe3+(PO4)6•2H2O, Bederite ([ ],Na)Ca2(Mn2+,Mg,Fe2+)2(Fe3+,Mg2+,Al)2Mn2+2(PO4)6•2H2O, Tassieite (Na,[ ])Ca2(Mg,Fe2+,Fe3+)2(Fe3+,Mg)2(Fe2+,Mg)2(PO4)6•2H2O 
 Anapaite Ca2Fe2+(PO4)2•4H2O, Prosperite CaZn2(AsO4)2•H2O, Parascholzite CaZn2(PO4)2•2H2O, Scholzite CaZn2(PO4)2•2H2O, Phosphophyllite Zn2(Fe2+,Mn)(PO4)2•4H2O, Cabalzarite Ca(Mg,Al,Fe2+)2(AsO4)2(H2O,OH)2, Grischunite NaCa2(Mn2+)5Fe3+(AsO4)6•2H2O

"Turquoise" supergroup 
Hydrated phosphates, etc., containing hydroxyl or halogen where (A)3 (XO4)2 Zq · H2O
 Burangaite group
 Burangaite (Na,Ca)2(Fe2+,Mg)2Al10(PO4)8(OH,O)12•4H2O, Dufrenite Fe2+(Fe3+)4(PO4)3(OH)5•2H2O, Natrodufrenite Na(Fe3+,Fe2+)(Fe3+,Al)5(PO4)4(OH)6•2H2O, Matioliite NaMgAl5(PO4)4(OH)6•2H2O, IMA2008-056 NaMn2+(Fe3+)5(PO4)4(OH)6•2H2O 
 Souzalite group 
 Souzalite (Mg,Fe2+)3(Al,Fe3+)4(PO4)4(OH)6•2H2O, Gormanite Fe2+3Al4(PO4)4(OH)6•2H2O, Andyrobertsite KCdCu5(AsO4)4[As(OH)2O2]•2H2O, Calcioandyrobertsite-1M KCaCu5(AsO4)4[As(OH)2O2]•2H2O, Calcioandyrobertsite-2O KCaCu5(AsO4)4[As(OH)2O2]•2H2O      
 Turquoise group
 Aheylite (Fe2+,Zn)Al6[(OH)4|(PO4)2]2·4H2O, Chalcosiderite Cu(Fe3+,Al)6[(OH)4|(PO4)2]2·4H2O, Faustite (Zn,Cu)Al6[(OH)4|(PO4)2]2·4H2O, Planerite Al6[(OH)4|HPO4|PO4]2·4H2O, Turquoise Cu(Al,Fe3+)6[(OH)4|(PO4)2]2·4H2O
 Unnamed group
Sampleite NaCaCu5(PO4)4Cl•5H2O, Lavendulan NaCaCu5(AsO4)4Cl•5H2O, Zdenekite NaPb(Cu2+)5(AsO4)4Cl•5H2O, Mahnertite (Na,Ca)(Cu2+)3(AsO4)2Cl•5H2O, Lemanskiite NaCaCu5(AsO4)4Cl•5H2O
 Duhamelite? Pb2Cu4Bi(VO4)4(OH)3•8H2O, Santafeite (Mn,Fe,Al,Mg)2(Mn4+,Mn2+)2(Ca,Sr,Na)3(VO4,AsO4)4(OH)3•2H2O, Ogdensburgite Ca2(Zn,Mn)(Fe3+)4(AsO4)4(OH)6•6H2O, Dewindtite Pb3[H(UO2)3O2(PO4)2]2•12H2O

"Overite" supergroup 
Hydrated phosphates, etc., containing hydroxyl or halogen where (AB)4 (XO4)3 Zq · H2O
 Overite group 
Overite CaMgAl(PO4)2(OH)•4H2O, Segelerite CaMgFe3+(PO4)2(OH)•4H2O, Manganosegelerite (Mn,Ca)(Mn,Fe2+,Mg)Fe3+(PO4)2(OH)•4H2O, Lunokite (Mn,Ca)(Mg,Fe2+,Mn)Al(PO4)2(OH)•4H2O, Wilhelmvierlingite CaMn2+Fe3+(PO4)2(OH)•2H2O, Kaluginite* (Mn2+,Ca)MgFe3+(PO4)2(OH)•4H2O, Juonniite CaMgSc(PO4)2(OH)•4H2O 
Jahnsite group 
Jahnsite-(CaMnMg) CaMnMg2(Fe3+)2(PO4)4(OH)2•8H2O, Jahnsite-(CaMnFe) CaMn2+(Fe2+)2(Fe3+)2(PO4)4(OH)2•8H2O, Jahnsite-(CaMnMn) CaMn2+(Mn2+)2(Fe3+)2(PO4)4(OH)2•8H2O, Jahnsite-(MnMnMn)* MnMnMn2(Fe3+)2(PO4)4(OH)2•8H2O 
Whiteite group 
Whiteite-(CaFeMg) Ca(Fe2+,Mn2+)Mg2Al2(PO4)4(OH)2•8H2O, Whiteite-(MnFeMg) (Mn2+,Ca)(Fe2+,Mn2+)Mg2Al2(PO4)4(OH)2•8H2O, Whiteite-(CaMnMg) CaMn2+Mg2Al2(PO4)4(OH)2•8H2O, Rittmannite Mn2+Mn2+Fe2+Al2(OH)2(PO4)4•8H2O, Jahnsite-(CaFeFe) (Ca,Mn)(Fe2+,Mn2+)(Fe2+)2(Fe3+)2(PO4)4(OH)2•8H2O, Jahnsite-(NaFeMg) NaFe3+Mg2(Fe3+)2(PO4)4(OH)2•8H2O, Jahnsite-(CaMgMg) CaMgMg2(Fe3+)2(PO4)4(OH)2•8H2O, Jahnsite-(NaMnMg) NaMnMg2(Fe3+)2(PO4)4(OH)2•8H2O 
Leucophosphite group 
Leucophosphite K(Fe3+)2(PO4)2(OH)•2H2O, Tinsleyite KAl2(PO4)2(OH)•2H2O, Spheniscidite (NH4,K)(Fe3+,Al)2(PO4)2(OH)•2H2O 
Montgomeryite group 
Montgomeryite Ca4MgAl4(PO4)6(OH)4•12H2O, Kingsmountite (Ca,Mn2+)4(Fe2+,Mn2+)Al4(PO4)6(OH)4•12H2O, Calcioferrite Ca4Fe2+(Fe3+,Al)4(PO4)6(OH)4•12H2O, Zodacite Ca4Mn2+(Fe3+)4(PO4)6(OH)4•12H2O, Angastonite CaMgAl2(PO4)2(OH)4•7H2O
Strunzite group 
Strunzite Mn2+(Fe3+)2(PO4)2(OH)2•6H2O, Ferrostrunzite Fe2+(Fe3+)2(PO4)2(OH)2•6H2O, Ferristrunzite Fe3+(Fe3+)2(PO4)2(OH)3•5H2O 
Laueite group 
Laueite Mn2+(Fe3+)2(PO4)2(OH)2•8H2O, Stewartite Mn2+(Fe3+)2(PO4)2(OH)2•8H2O, Pseudolaueite Mn2+(Fe3+)2(PO4)2(OH)2•(7-8)H2O, Ushkovite Mg(Fe3+)2(PO4)2(OH)2•8H2O, Ferrolaueite Fe2+(Fe3+)2(PO4)2(OH)2•8H2O 
Gatumbaite group
Gatumbaite CaAl2(PO4)2(OH)2•H2O, Kleemanite ZnAl2(PO4)2(OH)2•3H2O 
Vanuralite group
Vanuralite Al(UO2)2(VO4)2(OH)•11H2O, Metavanuralite Al(UO2)2(VO4)2(OH)•8H2O, Threadgoldite Al(UO2)2(PO4)2(OH)•8H2O, Chistyakovaite Al(UO2)2(AsO4)2(F,OH)•6.5H2O
Vauxite group
Vauxite Fe2+Al2(PO4)2(OH)2•6H2O, Paravauxite Fe2+Al2(PO4)2(OH)2•8H2O, Sigloite Fe3+Al2(PO4)2(OH)3•5H2O, Gordonite MgAl2(PO4)2(OH)2•8H2O, Mangangordonite (Mn2+,Fe2+,Mg)Al2(PO4)2(OH)2•8H2O, Kastningite (Mn2+,Fe2+,Mg)Al2(PO4)2(OH)2•8H2O, Maghrebite MgAl2(AsO4)2(OH)2•8H2O
Bermanite group
Bermanite Mn2+(Mn3+)2(PO4)2(OH)2•4H2O, Ercitite Na2(H2O)4[(Mn3+)2(OH)2(PO4)2]
Arthurite group/ Whitmoreite group
Whitmoreite Fe2+(Fe3+)2(PO4)2(OH)2•4H2O, Arthurite Cu(Fe3+)2(AsO4,PO4,SO4)2(O,OH)2•4H2O, Ojuelaite Zn(Fe3+)2(AsO4)2(OH)2•4H2O, Earlshannonite (Mn,Fe2+)(Fe3+)2(PO4)2(OH)2•4H2O, Gladiusite (Fe2+)2(Fe3+,Mg)4(PO4)(OH)13•H2O, Cobaltarthurite Co(Fe3+)2(AsO4)2(OH)2•4H2O, Kunatite Cu(Fe3+)2(PO4)2(OH)2•4H2O, Bendadaite Fe2+(Fe3+)2(AsO4)2(OH)2•4H2O
Sincosite group
Sincosite Ca(V4+O)2(PO4)2•5H2O, Phosphovanadylite (Ba,Ca,K,Na)x[(V,Al)4P2(O,OH)16]•12H2O x~0.66, Bariosincosite Ba(V4+O)2(PO4)2•4H2O 
Paulkerrite group
Paulkerrite K(Mg,Mn)2(Fe3+,Al)2Ti(PO4)4(OH)3•15H2O, Mantienneite KMg2Al2Ti(PO4)4(OH)3•15H2O, Matveevite? KTiMn2(Fe3+)2(PO4)4(OH)3•15H2O, Benyacarite (H2O,K)2Ti(Mn2+,Fe2+)2(Fe3+,Ti)2Ti(PO4)4(O,F)2•14H2O 
Keckite Ca(Mn,Zn)2(Fe3+)3(PO4)4(OH)3•2H2O, Minyulite KAl2(PO4)2(OH,F)•4H2O, Giniite Fe2+(Fe3+)4(PO4)4(OH)2•2H2O, Metavauxite Fe2+Al2(PO4)2(OH)2•8H2O, Metavauxite Fe2+Al2(PO4)2(OH)2•8H2O, Xanthoxenite Ca4(Fe3+)2(PO4)4(OH)2•3H2O, Beraunite Fe2+(Fe3+)5(PO4)4(OH)5•4H2O, Furongite Al2(UO2)(PO4)3(OH)2•8H2O, Mcauslanite H(Fe2+)3Al2(PO4)4F•18H2O, Vochtenite (Fe2+,Mg)Fe3+[(UO2)(PO4)]4(OH)•(12-13)H2O

Alunite supergroup - Part II 
 Beudantite group, AB3(XO4)(SO4)(OH)6  
 Beudantite PbFe3[(OH)6|SO4|AsO4], Corkite PbFe3(PO4)(SO4)(OH)6, Gallobeudantite PbGa3(AsO4)(SO4)(OH)6, Hidalgoite PbAl3(AsO4)(SO4)(OH)6, Hinsdalite PbAl3(PO4)(SO4)(OH)6, Kemmlitzite (Sr,Ce)Al3(AsO4)(SO4)(OH)6, Svanbergite SrAl3(PO4)(SO4)(OH)6, Weilerite BaAl3H[(As,P)O4]2(OH)6, Woodhouseite CaAl3(PO4)(SO4)(OH)6 
Dussertite group/ Arsenocrandallite group
 Arsenocrandallite (Ca,Sr)Al3[(As,P)O4]2(OH)5•H2O, Arsenoflorencite-(Ce) (Ce,La)Al3(AsO4)2(OH), Arsenogorceixite BaAl3AsO3(OH)(AsO4,PO4)(OH,F)6, Arsenogoyazite (Sr,Ca,Ba)Al3(AsO4,PO4)2(OH,F)5•H2O, Dussertite Ba(Fe3+)3(AsO4)2(OH)5, Graulichite-(Ce) Ce(Fe3+)3(AsO4)2(OH)6, Philipsbornite PbAl3(AsO4)2(OH)5•H2O, Segnitite Pb(Fe3+)3H(AsO4)2(OH)6  
Plumbogummite group/ Crandallite group 
Benauite HSr(Fe3+)3(PO4)2(OH)6, Crandallite CaAl3[(OH)5|(PO4)2]·H2O, Eylettersite (Th,Pb)(1-x)Al3(PO4,SiO4)2(OH)6(?), Florencite-(Ce) CeAl3(PO4)2(OH)6, Florencite-(La) LaAl3(PO4)2(OH)6, Florencite-(Nd) (Nd,La,Ce)Al3(PO4)2(OH)6, Gorceixite BaAl3(PO4)(PO3OH)(OH)6, Goyazite SrAl3(PO4)2(OH)5•H2O, Kintoreite Pb(Fe3+)3(PO4)2(OH,H2O)6, Plumbogummite PbAl3(PO4)2(OH)5•H2O, Springcreekite BaV3(PO4)2(OH,H2O)6, Waylandite BiAl3(PO4)2(OH)6, Zairite Bi(Fe3+,Al)3(PO4)2(OH)6, Mills et al. (2009)

Class: Non simple phosphates 
 Stibiconite group
 Stibiconite Sb3+(Sb5+)2O6(OH), Bindheimite Pb2Sb2O6(O,OH), Romeite (Ca,Fe2+,Mn,Na)2(Sb,Ti)2O6(O,OH,F), Hydroxycalcioroméite (Lewisite) (Ca,Fe2+,Na)2(Sb,Ti)2O7, Monimolite (Pb,Ca)2Sb2O7, Stetefeldtite Ag2Sb2O6(O,OH), Bismutostibiconite Bi(Sb5+,Fe3+)2O7, Partzite Cu2Sb2(O,OH)7 (?)
 Rossite group
 Rossite CaV2O6•4H2O, Metarossite CaV2O6•2H2O, Ansermetite MnV2O6•4H2O 
 Pascoite group 
 Pascoite Ca3V10O28•17H2O, Magnesiopascoite Ca2Mg[V10O28]•16H2O
 Vanadium oxysalts (Hydrated) 
 Hewettite group
 Hewettite CaV6O16•9H2O, Metahewettite CaV6O16•3H2O, Barnesite Na2V6O16•3H2O, Hendersonite Ca1.3V6O16•6H2O, Grantsite Na4Cax(V4+)2xV5+(12-2x)O32•8H2O
 Straczekite group
 Straczekite (Ca,K,Ba)(V5+,V4+)8O20•3H2O, Corvusite (Na,Ca,K)V8O20•4H2O), Fernandinite CaV8O20•4H2O, Bariandite Al0.6V8O20•9H2O, Bokite (Al,Fe3+)1.3(V4+,Fe)8O20•4.7H2O, Kazakhstanite (Fe3+)5(V4+)3(V5+)12O39(OH)9•9H2O
 Schubnelite Fe2+(V5+O4)H2O, Fervanite (Fe3+)4(VO4)4•5H2O, Bannermanite (Na,K)0.7(V5+)6O15, Melanovanadite Ca(V4+)2(V5+)2O10•5H2O 
 Anhydrous Molybdates and Tungstates where A XO4
 Wolframite series 
 Wolframite* (Fe,Mn)WO4, Hubnerite MnWO4, Ferberite Fe2+WO4, Sanmartinite (Zn,Fe2+)WO4, Heftetjernite ScTaO4
 Scheelite series
 Scheelite CaWO4, Powellite CaMoO4
 Wulfenite Series
 Wulfenite PbMoO4, Stolzite PbWO4
 Raspite PbWO4

Category 10 
 

 Organic Compounds
 :Category:Coal
 :Category:Oil shale

Class: Organic minerals
 :Category:Oxalate minerals

Extras 
Rocks, ores and other mixtures of minerals
Lapislazuli*, Psilomelane*, Olivine* (Fayalite-Forsterite Series)
Ice
Liquids: Water, Mercury Hg, Asphaltum*
Amorphous solids: Polycrase, Pyrobitumen*, Amber*
Vitreous (melts by heating): Tektite, Obsidian

See also

References 

 
 
 
 

Minerals
Mineralogy